NGC 1313 (also known as the Topsy Turvy Galaxy) is a field galaxy and a barred spiral galaxy discovered by the Scottish astronomer James Dunlop on 27 September 1826. It has a diameter of about 50,000 light-years, or about half the size of the Milky Way.

NGC 1313 lies within the Virgo Supercluster.

In 2007, a rare WO star was discovered in NGC 1313, currently known by its only designation of [HC2007] 31. It is of spectral type WO3. The derived absolute magnitude is about -5, which is very high for a single WO star. (WOs usually have absolute magnitudes of about -1 to -4) This means that the WO is likely part of a binary or a small stellar association.

Features
NGC 1313 has a strikingly uneven shape and its axis of rotation is not exactly in its centre.  NGC 1313 also shows strong starburst activity and associated supershells. NGC 1313 is dominated by scattered patches of intense star formation, which gives the galaxy a rather ragged appearance. The uneven shape, the ragged appearance and the strong starburst can all be explained by a galactic collision in the past. However, NGC 1313 seems to be an isolated galaxy and has no direct neighbours. Therefore, it is not clear whether it has swallowed a small companion in its past.

Young, blue stars are scattered across the galaxy. This is evidence of infant mortality in which the young open clusters quickly became gravitationally "unglued", scattering their resident stars into the galaxy. The galaxy bears some resemblance to the Magellanic Clouds and hosts two ultraluminous X-ray sources, called NGC 1313 X-1 and X-2. The former is a rare intermediate-mass black hole.

References

External links
 

Virgo Supercluster
1313
Barred spiral galaxies
Field galaxies
18260927
012286
Reticulum (constellation)